Marouane Braiek (born 14 August 1985) is a retired Tunisian football goalkeeper.

References

1985 births
Living people
Tunisian footballers
US Monastir (football) players
CA Bizertin players
ES Métlaoui players
US Ben Guerdane players
Association football goalkeepers
Tunisian Ligue Professionnelle 1 players